Since the inception of the Rugby World Cup in 1987, a total of 57 players have scored three tries or drop goals (a hat-trick) in a single match. The first player to achieve the feat was Craig Green, who scored four tries in New Zealand's 74–13 victory over Fiji during the 1987 Rugby World Cup. His teammate John Gallagher also scored four tries in this match. Besides Green and Gallagher, 14 players have scored more than three tries in a match; of these, Chris Latham and Josh Lewsey have scored five, while Marc Ellis scored six in New Zealand's 145–17 victory against Japan in 1995. Two of Ellis's teammates, Eric Rush and Jeff Wilson, also scored hat-tricks in this game. Four players have scored a hat-trick of drop goals: Jannie De Beer, Jonny Wilkinson, Juan Martín Hernández and Theuns Kotzé. Of these, De Beer scored the most in one match, with five drop goals in South Africa's 44–21 victory over England in the 1999 Rugby World Cup.

Hat-tricks are more likely to occur in the pool stages, where higher ranked teams, such as New Zealand, who have scored fourteen World Cup hat-tricks, face lower ranked opposition, such as Namibia, who have conceded hat-tricks on nine occasions. There have only been six hat-tricks in the World Cup knockout stages: Chester Williams and Jonah Lomu in 1995, De Beer in 1999, Wilkinson in 2003, and Julian Savea and Adam Ashley-Cooper in 2015.

Five players have scored two World Cup hat-tricks, Savea being the only one to have scored both in the same tournament. Of the six teams in the Six Nations and four in the Rugby Championship teams, only Italy have failed to score a hat-trick at the World Cup. Fiji, Namibia and Samoa are the only other teams to score a hat-trick, which were scored by Vereniki Goneva, Kotze and Alesana Tuilagi, respectively. Goneva and Kotze's hat-tricks are the only time players on opposing teams have accomplished this feat in the same match at the 2011 Rugby World Cup.

Hat-tricks
Unless noted otherwise, the players listed below scored a hat-trick of tries.

Multiple hat-tricks

By national team

References
General
 
 

Specific

World Cup Hat-trick
HAt
Hat
Rugby world